The men's 800 metres at the 2011 IPC Athletics World Championships is held at the QEII Stadium on 22-23 and 26–29 January

Medalists

T11

T12

T13

T36

T37
The Men's 800 metres, T37 was held on January 28

T37 = spasticity in an arm and leg on one side of the body, good functional ability on the other side.

Final

Key:  WR = World record, SB = Seasonal best, AR = Area Record, R 125.5 = Warning by unsporting manner

T46

T52

T53

T54

See also
List of IPC world records in athletics

References
General
Complete Results Book from the 2011 IPC Athletics World Championships
Schedule and results, Official site of the 2011 IPC Athletics World Championships
IPC Athletics Classification Explained, Scottish Disability Sport
Specific

External links
ParalympicSport.TV on YouTube
2011 IPC Athletics World Championships:: Mens 800m T11
2011 IPC Athletics World Championships: Men's 800m T37
2011 IPC Athletics World Championships: Men's 800m T52

800 metres
800 metres at the World Para Athletics Championships